Willy Rösner (1893–1966) was a German stage and film actor.

Selected filmography
 The King's Prisoner (1935)
 The Monastery's Hunter (1935)
 The Hunter of Fall (1936)
 Frau Sixta (1938)
 Water for Canitoga (1939)
 Late Love (1943)
 The War of the Oxen (1943)
 The Violin Maker of Mittenwald (1950)
 The Cloister of Martins (1951)
 Border Post 58 (1951)
 Cuba Cabana (1952)
 The Crucifix Carver of Ammergau (1952)
 The Monastery's Hunter (1953)
 Salto Mortale (1953)
 Marriage Strike (1953)
 The Beautiful Miller (1954)
 Ludwig II (1955)
 The Royal Waltz (1955)
 As Long as You Live (1955)
 In Hamburg When the Nights Are Long (1956)
 Kitty and the Great Big World (1956)
 Marriages Forbidden (1957)
 And Lead Us Not Into Temptation (1957)
 Storm in a Water Glass (1960)

References

Bibliography
 William B. Parrill. European Silent Films on Video: A Critical Guide. McFarland, 2006.

External links

1893 births
1966 deaths
German male stage actors
German male film actors